The 57th Pennsylvania House of Representatives District is located in southwest Pennsylvania and has been represented by Eric Nelson since 2016.

District profile 
The 57th District is located in Westmoreland County and includes the following areas:

Adamsburg
Arona
 Greensburg
 Hempfield Township
 New Stanton
 South Greensburg
 Southwest Greensburg
 Youngwood

Representatives

Recent election results

References

External links 

 District map from the United States Census Bureau
 Pennsylvania House Legislative District Maps from the Pennsylvania Redistricting Commission.
 Population Data for District 57 from the Pennsylvania Redistricting Commission.

Government of Westmoreland County, Pennsylvania
57